WampServer refers to a solution stack for the Microsoft Windows operating system, created by Romain Bourdon and consisting of the Apache web server, OpenSSL for SSL support, MySQL database and PHP programming language.

Notable lists, variants, and equivalents on other platforms
 LAMP: for the Linux operating system (The original AMP stack – explained here.)
 MAMP: for the macOS operating system
 SAMP: for Solaris operating system
 WIMP: A similar package where the Apache is replaced by Internet Information Services (IIS) 
 WISA: solution stack for Windows (operating system), consisting of  Internet Information Services, Microsoft SQL Server, and ASP.NET 
 XAMPP: A cross-platform web server solution stack package.

See also 
 Comparison of web frameworks
 List of AMP packages

References

External links 

Web server software
Website management
WAMP